James Edward Vesey, Sr. (born October 29, 1965) is an American former ice hockey player, who currently works as a scout for the Toronto Maple Leafs. He played 15 games in the National Hockey League with the St. Louis Blues and Boston Bruins between 1988 and 1991. The rest of his career, which lasted from 1988 to 1995, was spent in the minor leagues. His son, Jimmy, is currently playing in the NHL with the New York Rangers.

Biography
Vesey was born in Boston, Massachusetts. As a youth, he played in the 1978 Quebec International Pee-Wee Hockey Tournament with a minor ice hockey team from Boston.

Drafted 155th overall by the St. Louis Blues in the 1984 NHL Entry Draft, he went to play eleven games for the Blues, scoring a goal and two assists.  He signed with the Boston Bruins in 1991 and played four games for them, scoring no points.

His elder son, Jimmy Vesey, is an NHL player and was selected 66th overall by the Nashville Predators in the 2012 NHL Entry Draft and currently plays for the New York Rangers. A younger son, Nolan, plays for the University of Maine and was drafted by the Toronto Maple Leafs in 2014.

Career statistics

Regular season and playoffs

References

External links
 

1965 births
Living people
American men's ice hockey centers
Boston Bruins players
Ice hockey people from Massachusetts
Ice hockey people from Boston
Maine Mariners players
Merrimack Warriors men's ice hockey players
Peoria Rivermen (IHL) players
Phoenix Roadrunners (IHL) players
Providence Bruins players
St. Louis Blues draft picks
St. Louis Blues players